Elections to the French National Assembly were held in Niger on 2 January 1956 as part of the wider French elections. The Nigerien Progressive Party (PPN) and the Nigerien Action Bloc−Nigerien Progressive Union (BNA−UPN) alliance won one seat each. Georges Condat took the BNA−UPN seat, whilst Hamani Diori took the PPN seat.

Campaign
The Independent List included François Borrey, who had unsuccessfully contested the November 1946 elections, and Dabo Aboudakar.

Results

References

Niger
1956 in Niger
Elections in Niger